The United States Army Medical Materiel Center-Europe (USAMMCE), a subordinate unit of the U.S. Army Medical Research and Materiel Command at Fort Detrick, Maryland, serves as the Defense Logistics Agency’s Theater Lead Agent for Medical Materiel (TLAMM) for Europe.

USAMMCE's mission is to provide the best medical logistics support to the U.S. European Command. USAMMCE’s missions also include out-of-sector support to the Department of State Humanitarian Assistance Program and the U.S. Central Command in Southwest Asia. From the Gulf War through the Bosnia and Kosovo deployments, business process improvements at USAMMCE benefitted deployed forces throughout the European theater.

History
The United States Army Medical Materiel Center-Europe (USAMMCE) was originally activated as the Rhein Medical Depot in December 1951 in Kaiserslautern, Germany. In the spring of 1957, the Rhein Medical Depot was reorganized as the U.S. Army Medical Depot, Einsiedlerhof (USAMDE) and assumed the operation control of the 67th Medical Depot. USAMDE and the Medical Supply Division of the U.S. Army, Europe, were combined to form the U.S. Army Medical Materiel Center-Europe (USAMMCE) in October 1968.

USAMMCE moved to its current location in Pirmasens, Rhineland-Palatinate, Germany, in November 1975 as part of an Army–Air Force restationing initiative. The following medical supply, optical, and maintenance (MEDSOM) battalions were formed as subordinate units to USAMMCE in January 1980: 37th MEDSOM to support the U.S. V Corps, 428th MEDSOM to support the U.S. VII Corps, and the 226th MEDSOM to support the Communications Zone. USAMMCE was designated as the Theater Single Integrated Medical Logistics Manager in June 1986 and assumed medical logistics support responsibility for all U.S. Armed Forces serving the U.S. European Command. The 226th MEDSOM was redesignated as the 226th Medical Battalion (Logistics, Rear), the 37th was redesignated as the 37th Medical Detachment (Logistics), and the 428th as the 428th Theater Medical Materiel Management Center (TMMMC) in June 1993.

In October 1994, the 226th Medical Battalion (Logistics, Rear) was redesignated as the 226th Medical Battalion (Logistics, Forward) and was assigned to the 30th Medical Brigade, and the 37th Medical Detachment and the 428th TMMMC were inactivated.  Upon inactivation of the U.S. Army’s 7th Medical Command, USAMMCE was assigned to the U.S. Army Medical Research and Materiel Command in October 1994. USAMMCE became the executive agent for the Department of State’s Humanitarian Assistance Program on 1 October 1996.

In 2007, USAMMCE was designated as the TLAMM (Theater Lead Agent for Medical Materiel) for Europe. This designation allows USAMMCE to be more involved in logistical planning and coordination for two major combatant commands.

See also
Husterhoeh Kaserne
Kaiserslautern Military Community
Landstuhl Regional Medical Center
Münchweiler an der Rodalb

References 
This article contains information that originally came from US Government publications and websites and is in the public domain.

External links 
 USAMRMC website
 USAMMCE website
 USAMRMC: 50 Years of Dedication to the Warfighter (1958-2008)

Army, Materiel Center, Europe
Sustainment and support units and formations of the United States Army
Military units and formations established in 1968
Pirmasens